Rinzen is a sculpture by Antoni Tàpies conserved at MACBA, the Contemporary Art Museum of Barcelona.

Description
Rinzen is a masterful piece by the Catalan artist Antoni Tàpies, part of the permanent collection of the MACBA, since when joined the museum's collection thanks to a donation from Repsol to the MACBA Foundation.

It was designed for the Spanish Pavilion at the XLV Venice Biennale of 1993 and won the Golden Lion for this event. Six years later, in 1998, Tàpies installed the work permanently in the MACBA.

References

External links
 MACBA Collection Holdings

Sculptures in Catalonia
Culture in Barcelona
1993 sculptures
El Raval